Kaniyambadi was former constituency in the Tamil Nadu Legislative Assembly of Tamil Nadu a southern state of India. It was in Vellore district.

Members of Legislative Assembly

Election results

1971

1967

References

External links
 

Vellore district
Former assembly constituencies of Tamil Nadu